Greater Penang Conurbation is the built-up urban or metropolitan area within and around the state of Penang, Malaysia. The conurbation encompasses most of the state of Penang, which includes Penang Island and Seberang Perai, and parts of the neighbouring state of Kedah. The conurbation is alternatively referred to as the George Town Conurbation as George Town is the capital city of Penang as well as the most thriving and developed part in the conurbation.

The main urban centres in the conurbations are George Town, Bayan Lepas, Butterworth, Bukit Mertajam, Nibong Tebal; and in Kedah: Sungai Petani, Kulim and Bandar Baharu. The total population in the conurbation is over 2 million people and is the second largest metropolitan area in Malaysia after Greater Kuala Lumpur/Klang Valley.

The state of Penang is the second smallest in area at 1,048km2 after Perlis but has the highest population density at 1,451/km2 in Malaysia.

Population by local government area

The population table is based on the official census of 2010 for the local government areas within the George Town Conurbation.

References

Penang
P